An adparticle is an atom, molecule, or cluster of atoms or molecules that lies on a crystal surface.  The term is used in surface chemistry.  The word is a contraction of "adsorbed particle".  An adparticle that is a single atom may be referred to as an "adatom".

Surface science